Pseudopartona is a genus of the jumping spiders only found in French Guiana. , it contains only one species, Pseudopartona ornata.

References

  (2007): The world spider catalog, version 8.0. American Museum of Natural History.

Salticidae
Monotypic Salticidae genera
Spiders of South America

Endemic fauna of French Guiana